Gerald Verrier (born December 5, 1958) is an American former professional darts player who played in events of the Professional Darts Corporation (PDC).

Career
Verrier was brought in to make up the numbers in the inaugural 1994 WDC World Darts Championship, but competed in the first seven tournaments, although he never got past the first phase on any occasion. He had better luck in the World Matchplay, where he reached the last 16 in both the 1994 and 1998 tournaments.

World Championship performances

PDC
 1994: Last 24 group (lost to Bob Anderson 0–3) and (beat Dave Kelly 3–0) (sets)
 1995: Last 24 group (lost to Phil Taylor 2–3) and (lost to Sean Downs 0–3)
 1996: Last 24 group (lost to Bob Anderson 1–3) and (lost to Jamie Harvey 2–3)
 1997: Last 24 group (lost to Phil Taylor 0–3) and (beat Chris Mason 3–1)
 1998: Last 24 group (lost to Shayne Burgess 0–3) and (lost to Bob Anderson 1–3)
 1999: Last 32 (lost to Jamie Harvey 1–3)
 2000: Last 32 (lost to Peter Evison 0–3)

References

External links

1958 births
Living people
American darts players
Professional Darts Corporation early era players
Sportspeople from Salem, Oregon